Raymonds Hill is a former suburb of Ipswich, Queensland, Australia. In the early 1990s it was absorbed by neighbouring suburbs Brassall, the portion west of Waterworks Road, and North Ipswich. The remainder of Raymonds Hill is now officially a neighbourhood within North Ipswich.

References

Ipswich, Queensland